Ulise Petrescu (born August 9, 1902, date of death unknown) was a Romanian bobsledder who competed in the early 1930s. He finished sixth in the four-man event at the 1932 Winter Olympics in Lake Placid, New York.

References
1932 bobsleigh four-man results

1902 births
Year of death missing
Romanian male bobsledders
Olympic bobsledders of Romania
Bobsledders at the 1932 Winter Olympics